Cara Cilano is currently the chair professor of English at Michigan State University and also a published author of articles and books, being largely collected by libraries worldwide. She previously held the Fulbright Visiting Professor at University of Graz.

Bibliography
 National identities in Pakistan: the 1971 war in contemporary Pakistani fiction (2011)
 Contemporary Pakistani Fiction in English: Idea, Nation, State (2013)
 Post-9/11 Espionage Fiction in the US and Pakistan (2014)

References

External links
GoogleScholar

American non-fiction writers
University of North Carolina at Wilmington faculty
Duquesne University alumni
St. Bonaventure University alumni
Living people
Year of birth missing (living people)
Place of birth missing (living people)